The Diamond Tower is a skyscraper located in the Tel Aviv District city of Ramat Gan, Israel, containing the world's largest diamond trading hall, accommodating up to 1,000 people. At 115 meters and 32 floors, the tower was the tallest building in Ramat Gan from its completion until 2000, when it was surpassed by the Sheraton City Tower. It was also the tallest building in Israel outside of Tel Aviv upon its completion in 1992. Designed by Eli Gvirtzman, the tower serves as the 'head-tower' of the Israel Diamond Exchange with the first twenty floors serving only diamantaires.

See also
List of skyscrapers in Israel
Architecture of Israel
Economy of Israel

References
Diamond Tower at Emporis
Skyscraper office buildings in Israel
Diamond industry in Israel
Economy of Israel
Buildings and structures in Ramat Gan

Office buildings completed in 1992